= Thurum Khanlu =

- Directed by: Nakinamoni Shivakalyan
- Produced by: Md Asif Jani
- Starring: Shreeram Nimmala; Ishwarya Vullingala; Devraj Palamur; Avinash Chowdary; Seetha Mahalakshmi
- Cinematography: Charan Ambati
- Edited by: Bonthala Nageswara
- Music by: Suresh Bobbili
- Production company: Star Film Factory
- Release date: 8 September 2023
- Running time: 133 minutes
- Country: India
- Language: Telugu

Thurum Khanlu is a 2023 Indian Telugu language film directed by Nakinamoni Shivakalyan and produced by Md Asif Jani under Star Film Factory. The main lead cast are Shreeram Nimmala and Ishwarya Vullingla. The music score was composed by Suresh Bobbili and the cinematography was done by Charan Ambati. The film was released theatrically on 8 September 2023.

== Plot ==
In Tupakula Gudem, during the COVID-19 pandemic, Shankar, a youth leader, plans to marry Lalitha. Unmarried Viraj Brahmam, an alcoholic, also wants marriage. Shankar's wedding is canceled due to lockdown. Swapna helps unite Padma and Vishnu, while Brahmam wants an affair with Bharati. The story explores the relationships between Shankar, Brahmam, and Bharati.

== Cast ==
- Shreeram Nimmala
- Devaraj Palamur
- Avinash Chowdary
- Ishwarya Vullingala
- Seetha Mahalakshmi
